Cyrtodactylus albofasciatus, also known as Boulenger's Indian gecko or Deccan banded gecko, is a species of gecko. It is endemic to the Western Ghats, India. It was resurrected from synonymy of Cyrtodactylus deccanensis in 2004.

References

Cyrtodactylus
Reptiles of India
Endemic fauna of the Western Ghats
Reptiles described in 1885
Taxa named by George Albert Boulenger